Several ships of the Swedish Navy have been named HSwMS Psilander, named after admiral Gustaf von Psilander:

  was a torpedo cruiser launched in 1899 and decommissioned in 1937 and sunk as target in 1939
  was a  launched in 1926 and decommissioned in 1947

Swedish Navy ship names